Kalchas,  is a village and a community in the municipality of Komotini, in the Rhodope regional unit, East Macedonia and Thrace, Greece. It is located in a flat area, 5 km northeast of Komotini. The community consists of the villages Kalchas, Iampolis, Megali Ada and Mytikas. At the 2011 census, the population was 634 for the village, and 1,160 for the community.

The village is crossed by a small stream (known locally by the name Trelocheimarros), tributary of the Vozvozis, that often overflows during the winter causing problems in transportation. In 2011 the Army has placed a military bridge over the stream that improved significantly the transportation. The main occupation of the village residents is the cultivation of tobacco. Just outside the village passes the vertical axis of Egnatia Odos (A2) which leads to the Greek-Bulgarian border. (Komotini - Nymphaea - Makaza - Kardzhali)

References

Populated places in Rhodope (regional unit)